The Z. Smith Reynolds Foundation was formed by Mary Reynolds Babcock and her siblings to honor their brother, Zachary Smith Reynolds, who died under mysterious circumstances at the age of 20 at the Reynolds family home, Reynolda House. The Foundation donates millions of dollars annually in the state of North Carolina. In 2008, the fund donated $18 million in grants, including $2 million to Wake Forest University.

During the financial crisis of 2007–2008, the value of the Foundation's trust declined 30% from its high of $470 million in November 2007. The Foundation subsequently announced plans to revise the way it processes grants. The Foundation, which has focused on affordable housing, immigration, education and the environment, will focus its environmental grants on water, energy and growth. The Foundation's grants were slightly less (at $16 million) than the $18 million given in 2008, but cuts were steeper in 2010 and 2011.

In the past, the foundation has paid for a study about North Carolina's Work First welfare reform program, conducted by University of North Carolina at Chapel Hill researchers.

References

External links
 Official website

Non-profit organizations based in North Carolina
Foundations based in the United States
Organizations based in Winston-Salem, North Carolina
Reynolds family